Katrina Mogielnicki Spade (born September 9, 1977) is an American designer, entrepreneur, and death care advocate. Spade is the founder of Recompose, a public-benefit corporation developing a natural alternative to conventional cremation and burial. She was awarded the Echoing Green Climate Fellowship in 2014 and the Ashoka Fellowship in 2018 for her work.

Early life and education  
Spade grew up in rural New Hampshire and was raised by a physician and physician's assistant.  She told the Seattle Stranger of that time in her life, "We weren't religious, but we saw nature as somehow spiritual." She earned a Bachelor of Arts in anthropology from Haverford College in Pennsylvania, then turned her focus to sustainable design while attending Yestermorrow Design/Build School in Vermont. At Yestermorrow, Spade helped to build a Pain Mound - a compost-based bioenergy system invented by Jean Pain that can produce heat for up to 18 months. Later, while earning a Master of Architecture from the University of Massachusetts Amherst, she wrote a thesis entitled "A Place for the Urban Dead", an idea for which she was awarded the Echoing Green Climate Fellowship in 2014 and the Ashoka Fellowship in 2018.

Urban Death Project 

In considering her own mortality, Spade wanted options that were more environmentally sustainable and allowed family and friends to participate in the care of their loved one. She formulated early ideas about the possibility of human recomposition, but when she learned about the practice of livestock mortality composting, she began work to create the same option for humans. Spade founded the Urban Death Project in 2014 with a focus on developing a new system of death care called recomposition, which transforms human bodies into soil.

Recompose 
In 2018, the Urban Death Project dissolved and Spade founded Recompose, a public-benefit corporation. Similar to the Urban Death Project, Recompose is developing a patent pending process that converts human remains to soil. It seeks to create a scalable and sustainable alternative to natural burial, particularly for urban dwellers.

Natural Organic Reduction Legalized in Washington State 
Spade testified during the Washington State Legislative session for SB5001, which would add natural organic reduction (sometimes referred to as human composting) as a legal choice for human disposition. Democratic Senator Jamie Pederson, the bill's sponsor indicated, "“The main purpose is to provide more options to people in terms of how they can dispose of their own remains and those of their loved ones.  There are people who are very troubled by the environmental consequences with the current means of disposing of remains.”  The law takes effect in May 2020 and as the New York Times states, "will allow bodies to be placed in a receptacle, along with organic material like wood chips and straw, to help speed up the natural transition of human remains into soil. Farmers use a similar process to compost the bodies of livestock."  Spade intends to open her first facility in Seattle, Washington in May 2020.

Advocacy and awards 
 Awarded Ashoka Fellowship, October 2018
 SVP Social Venture Partners Fast Pitch 1st Place and Audience Choice Award, 2016
 Buckminster Fuller Prize Semifinalist, 2016 - Designs That Are Changing the World
Awarded Echoing Green Climate Fellowship, 2014
TED Speaker: When I Die, Recompose Me
 Member of "The Order of the Good Death", an "inclusive community of funeral industry professionals, academics, as well as artists who advocate for and make possible, a more death informed society."

References

External links 
 Recompose official website

1977 births
Living people
American designers
Ashoka Fellows
Ashoka USA Fellows
People from New Hampshire
Persons involved with death and dying
Women and death
American social entrepreneurs